This article is about music-related events in 1829.

Events
 March 11 – German composer Felix Mendelssohn (age 20) conducts the first performance of Johann Sebastian Bach's St Matthew Passion since the latter's death in 1750, at the Sing-Akademie zu Berlin; the success of this performance sparks a revival of interest in Bach.
 April–September – Mendelssohn pays his first visit to Britain. This visit included the first London performance of his concert overture to A Midsummer Night's Dream and his trip to Fingal's Cave.
 July – George Washington Dixon popularizes "Coal Black Rose" singing in blackface in New York City.
 December 29 – Soprano Eugenia Tadolini makes her house debut at the Teatro Regio di Parma.
 Frédéric Chopin concludes his studies at the music academy in Warsaw which will later be named after him. He also hears Paganini perform and begins writing his Etudes.

Popular music
"There's Nothing True but Heaven" words by Thomas Moore, music by Oliver Shaw

Classical music
Hector Berlioz – La Mort de Cleopatre
Norbert Burgmüller – Piano Concerto in F-sharp minor
Frederic Chopin 
Introduction and Polonaise Brillante Op. 3
Piano Trio Op. 8
Étude Op. 10, No. 8
Étude Op. 10, No. 9
Étude Op. 10, No. 10
Étude Op. 10, No. 11
Carl Czerny 
Piano Trio No.2, Op.166
Sonatina in A major, Op.167
Systematische Anleitung zum Fantasieren auf dem Pianoforte, Op.200
Fanny Hensel – Capriccio for Cello and Piano in A-flat major
Johann Nepomuk Hummel – Gesellschafts Rondo, Op.117
Friedrich Kuhlau
Fantaisie, Op.93
Introduction and Rondo on 'Le Colporteur', Op.98a
3 Brilliant Duos for 2 Flutes, Op.102
7 Variations on an Irish Folksong, Op.105
Caspar Kummer 
Adagio et Variations sur un Thême de l’Opéra : Armida, de Rossini, p. Cor de Bassette avec Orchestre, Op. 45
2 Duos for Flute and Clarinet, Op.46
Flute Trio, Op.53
Joseph Merk – Valses brillantes, Op.6
Gioachino Rossini – William Tell Overture

Opera
Michael William Balfe – I rivali di se stessi
Gioacchino Rossini – Guillaume Tell (William Tell) first performed in Paris.  Libretto by Étienne de Jouy, Florent Bis and Armand Marrast.

Births
January 24 – William Mason, pianist and composer (d. 1908)
February 4 – Marquis d'Ivry, composer (died 1903)
February 11 – Camillo Walzel, librettist (died 1895)
March 6 – Heinrich Lichner, composer (d. 1898)
May 8 – Louis Moreau Gottschalk, pianist and composer (d. 1869)
May 9 – Ciro Pinsuti, pianist and composer (d. 1888)
June 9 – Gaetano Braga, cellist and composer (d. 1907)
June 11 – Horace Poussard, violinist and composer (d. 1898)
August 7 –  Timoteo Pasini, composer, conductor, and pianist (d. 1888)
August 21 – Otto Goldschmidt, pianist, conductor and composer (d. 1907)
August 25 – Carlo Acton, pianist and composer (d. 1909)
August 28 – Albert Dietrich, composer (d. 1908)
October 6 – Josef Gänsbacher, music educator (died 1911)
November 28 – Anton Rubinstein, pianist, conductor and composer (d. 1894)
date unknown
Fritz Andersen, composer (died 1910)

Deaths
January 25 – William Shield, violinist and composer (b. 1748)
January 30 – Friedrich Haug, lyricist (born 1761)
February 16 – François Joseph Gossec, composer (b. 1734)
February 18 – Jan Křtitel Kuchař, organist, composer and teacher (b. 1751)
April 28 – Karl Gottlieb Umbreit, composer (born 1763)
May 8 – Mauro Giuliani, guitarist and composer (b. 1781)
August 15 – Christian Gottlieb Scheidler, composer (born 1747)
August 16 – Carl Gotthelf Gläser, hymnist (born 1784)
October 29 – Maria Anna Mozart, elder sister of Wolfgang Amadeus Mozart (b. 1751)
December 14 – Luigi Marchesi, castrato singer (b. 1754)

References

 
19th century in music
Music by year